The Government Polytechnic Talwar is located in Jaisinghpur, India. It has seats for 40 students in Automotive engineering, and 40 in Civil engineering.

References

External links

Government universities and colleges in India
Engineering colleges in Himachal Pradesh
Education in Kangra district